Yegor Borisovich Mikhailov (sometimes Egor, Igor) (born 23 July 1978 in Moscow) is a Russian professional ice hockey winger currently playing for HC Spartak Moscow of the Kontinental Hockey League.

Mikhailov played the 1996–97 season in North America with the Spokane Chiefs of the Western Hockey League.

References

External links

1978 births
Living people
HC CSKA Moscow players
HC Dynamo Moscow players
HC Spartak Moscow players
Metallurg Magnitogorsk players
Russian ice hockey right wingers
SKA Saint Petersburg players
Spokane Chiefs players
Ice hockey people from Moscow